Qatar-Sweden Relations are the bilateral relations between the Kingdom of Sweden and the State of Qatar. The relations are based on trade between the countries.
Sweden has an embassy in West Bay in Doha, Qatar. The embassy opened on May 14, 2014.
Qatar has an embassy in Stockholm, Sweden and the ambassador of Qatar to Sweden is Shka. Moza bint Nasser Ahmad Al-Thani.

The economic relations between the countries are based on cooperation between Swedish and Qatari companies, mainly in the oil and the natural gas sector.

See also 
 Foreign relations of Qatar
 Foreign relations of Sweden

References

External links 
 Sweden-Qatar Friendship Association
 Embassy of Sweden in Doha, Qatar

 
Sweden
Bilateral relations of Sweden